The Abydos King List, also known as the Abydos Table, is a list of the names of 76 kings of ancient Egypt, found on a wall of the Temple of Seti I at Abydos, Egypt. It consists of three rows of 38 cartouches (borders enclosing the name of a king) in each row. The upper two rows contain names of the kings, while the third row merely repeats Seti I's throne name and nomen.

Besides providing the order of the Old Kingdom kings, it is the sole source to date of the names of many of the kings of the Seventh and Eighth Dynasties, so the list is valued greatly for that reason.

This list omits the names of many earlier pharaohs who were apparently considered illegitimate — those were the Hyksos, Hatshepsut, Akhenaten, Smenkhkare, Tutankhamen, Sobekneferu, Mentuhotep I, Intef I, Intef II, Intef III, pharaohs of the Second Intermediate Period of Egypt and Ay.

Contents of the king list

First Dynasty

Second Dynasty

Third Dynasty

Fourth Dynasty

Fifth Dynasty

Sixth Dynasty

Eighth Dynasty

Eleventh/Twelfth Dynasty

Eighteenth Dynasty

Nineteenth Dynasty

See also
 Karnak king list
 Palermo Stone
 Saqqara Tablet
 Turin King List
 Medinet Habu king list

External links
Abydos Table
Abydos King List

13th-century BC works
Abydos, Egypt
Ancient Egyptian King lists
Egyptian inscriptions